Parhat may refer to:

Parhat Azimat (born 1976), Chinese football player
Hozaifa Parhat (born 1971), Uyghur refugee imprisoned in the US Guantanamo Bay detention camps, petitioner in Parhat v. Gates